Johan Hendrik Potgieter Strauss  (born 27 September 1951 in Alberton, Gauteng, South Africa) is a former South African rugby union player.

Playing career
Strauss played for Transvaal and the Springboks. He made his international debut in the third test against the visiting All Blacks on 4 September 1976, at Newlands, Cape Town. Strauss played a further two tests for the Springboks, the last being against the touring South American Jaguars on 26 April 1980 at the Wanderers Stadium, Johannesburg.

Test history

See also
List of South Africa national rugby union players – Springbok no. 490

References

1951 births
Living people
South African rugby union players
South Africa international rugby union players
Golden Lions players
People from Alberton, Gauteng
Rugby union players from Gauteng
Rugby union props